Vanguard is a television documentary series that was broadcast on the now defunct Current TV television network. Vanguard reported on such issues as the environment, drugs, and the effects of globalization and conflict.

The focus of most Vanguard episodes is to explore and immerse viewers in global issues that have a large social significance. Unlike sound-bite driven reporting, the show's correspondents conduct interviews with affected peoples and the regions involved usually being led by a guide and translator who facilitates access. Since Vanguard's subject matter often involved exposés about organized crime, drug trafficking and armed revolts, the correspondents can face significant danger because of their reporting due to unstable political or security situations.

Vanguard has received some of the media industry's highest honors for journalism, including the 69th Annual Peabody Award, given for excellence in electronic media, and the 2010 Television Academy Honor, which recognizes "achievements in programming that present issues of concern to our society in a compelling, emotional and insightful way." Vanguard has also been awarded the 2009 Alfred I. duPont-Columbia Award and the 2009 Livingston Award, and has been nominated four times for a News and Documentary Emmy Award and also for a Sports Emmy Award.

Vice president of the Vanguard journalism unit Laura Ling and her colleague Euna Lee were detained in North Korea after they allegedly crossed into North Korea from the People's Republic of China without a visa. They were subsequently pardoned after former U.S. President Bill Clinton flew to North Korea to meet with Kim Jong-il. They were producing a piece for Vanguard at the time of their detainment as shown in a Vanguard episode titled "Captive in North Korea".

In April 2012 Current announced that it would produce six new episodes of Vanguard. However, according to their own Facebook Page, apparently only two episodes were created in season 6 before the Vanguard series was ended, falling 4 episodes short of their originally announced plan. The Vanguard homepage and blog, a section of Current TV's website, were also ended when the Current TV website was shut down.

In 2013 Al Jazeera Media Network bought Current TV and after several months created Al Jazeera America. The new channel took what remained of Vanguard's team and merged them into Al Jazeera's investigative unit and the America Tonight team. Christof Putzel continues on at Al Jazeera America as a correspondent on the investigative reporting series America Tonight'."

Episodes

Season 1

Season 2

Season 3

Season 4
Special - Captive in North Korea (Interview with former Vanguard VP Laura Ling)

Season 5

Season 6

 See also 
 The 90's (1989-1992)
 Fault Lines'' (2009-2018)

References

External links
Official Webpage

Current TV original programming
Peabody Award-winning television programs
2000s American documentary television series
2010s American documentary television series
2008 American television series debuts
2013 American television series endings
Television Academy Honors winners